The Voice of the People is an anthology of folk songs produced by Topic Records containing recordings of traditional singers and musicians from England, Ireland, Scotland and Wales.

The series was first issued in 1998 as 20 CDs, compiled by Dr Reg Hall, a visiting fellow at Sussex University. 
A second series was issued in 2012 consisting of four volumes (7 CDs) compiled by Shirley Collins, Steve Roud and Rod Stradling.
A third series was issued in 2013 comprising 4 albums ( 6 CDs and 1 DVD) of field recordings recorded by Peter Kennedy and selected by Dr Reg Hall. A fourth series was released in 2016 with two albums of three CDs each chronicling the music of the 'London-Irish' from the 1950s to the present day.

Introduction
The traditional singers and musicians were celebrities within their own community but the majority were unknown to the world at large until the 1950s and 60s when collectors arrived with portable tape recorders. A few of them recorded enough material for an entire album. Most are known for a couple of songs. A few scraps of biographical notes are given in booklets that accompany the discs. Every one of them led working-class lives. Volumes 9 and 19 are collections of instrumentals. In a few cases the singers used song books or ballad sheets to supplement their repertoire, but in most cases their versions are from oral tradition. This collection is the UK equivalent of Harry Smith's Anthology of American Folk Music.

Reviews
Brian Peters wrote in Roots World as "the crème de la crème of Britain's traditional singers and musicians". Veteran Records said it was "the greatest set of CDs of English, Irish and Scottish singing and music ever produced."

The album is listed in the accompanying book to the Topic Records 70 year anniversary boxed set Three Score and Ten as one of their classic records with Creeping Jane from volume 8 as the tenth track on the first CD and The Nut Dance from volume 16 as the first track on the second CD.

Track listing
The titles detailed below are those used by the singers although there are often other titles for the songs so the links may go to a different title. The references in parentheses for songs are from the three major numbering schemes for folk songs, the Roud Folk Song Index, Child Ballad Numbers originating from Francis James Child and the Laws Numbers from the George Malcolm Laws numbering system.

First series

The tune tracks are 6 with fiddle and piano, 9 bagpipes and track 15 accordion.  All the other tracks are songs unaccompanied except track 5 accompanied by banjo and tracks 13 and 18 by banjo and fiddle.

Track 7 is a Morris dance tune with fiddle and vocals and track 25 is a dance tune on melodeons.  All the remaining tracks are unaccompanied voice except track 9 accompanied by accordion, track 17 accompanied by fiddle and piano-accordion and track 21 accompanied by piano-accordion.

The Voice of the People – A Selection from the Series of Anthologies
This album released in 1998 contains one track from each of the first twenty volumes of the series.

Second series

Selected by Steve Roud.

All the tracks are sung by Sarah Makem and selected by Rod Stradling from recordings made in the 1950s and 1960s.

Third series

A selection of Dance Music in Northumberland and Cumberland

The album consists of a CD and a DVD of recordings made by Peter Kennedy in Suffolk during the 1950s and selected by Reg Hall.

The film on the DVD has also been issued on the BFI DVD "Here’s a Health to the Barley Mow".  The filming took place mainly on 19 November with some additional shots and part of The Nutting Girl on 10 December 1955 in the Ship Inn, Blaxhall.

 
The album consists of three CDs recorded by Peter Kennedy and Sean O’Boyle in 1952 and 1953.

CD1

The CD contains a mixture of dance tunes and songs from the two counties, Fermanagh and Donegal

CD2 Dance Music

CD3 recordings made of the Travelling People
All the tracks are unaccompanied voice including the hornpipe.

CD3 Travellers

Instrumentalists

Fourth series
On 16 March 2016 Topic Records issued 2 more albums in the series to commemorate the traditional music of the 'London-Irish'.  These two albums were compiled by Reg Hall.  Both albums consist of 3 CDs and contain collections or rare recordings from Topic Records own archive, the Peter Kennedy archive in the British Library and many private collections.  The albums are:

It was mighty - The early days of Irish music in London

It was great altogether - The continuing tradition of Irish music in London

References

External links
 Topic Records
 Technical aspects of recording the series
 Review of Voice of the People

1998 in music
Compilation album series
Folk compilation albums
English folk music
Irish folk music
Scottish folk music
Welsh folk music